Jean-Jacques d'Esparbès (or Desparbès; 12 January 1720 – 13 March 1810) was a French soldier who was briefly Governor of Saint-Domingue in 1792 during the French Revolution.

Life

Jean-Jacques d'Esparbès was born on 12 January 1720.
He married a cousin of Madame de Pompadour.
He was made maréchal de camp on 25 July 1762, and lieutenant general on 1 March 1780.
He commanded the 20th Military Division at Montauban in July 1790.

D'Esparbès was appointed governor of Santo Domingo in 1792 and accompanied three new civil commissars to the island, Léger-Félicité Sonthonax, Étienne Polverel and Jean-Antoine Ailhaud.
He was to replace governor Philibert François Rouxel de Blanchelande.
The expedition included 6,000 soldiers.
The future governor Étienne Maynaud de Bizefranc de Laveaux was lieutenant-colonel in command of a detachment of 200 men of the 16th regiment of dragoons.
They reached Cap-Français (now Cap-Haïtien) on 18 September 1792.

The commissioners found that many of the white planters were hostile to the increasingly radical revolutionary movement and were joining the royalist opposition.
The commissioners announced that they did not intend to abolish slavery, but had come to ensure that free men had equal rights whatever their color.
D'Esparbes worked against the commissioners and became popular with the royalist planters.
On 21 October 1792, the commissioners dismissed d'Esparbès and named the vicomte de Rochambeau governor general of Santo Domingo.

Both D'Esparbès and his predecessor Blanchelande were deported to France.
D'Esparbès was accused of disloyalty on 4 February 1793, but was acquitted by the Revolutionary Tribunal on 27 April 1793 and withdrew from public life.
He died on 13 March 1810.

Work

Surviving writings by d'Esparbès include:

Notes

Sources

1720 births
1810 deaths
French generals
Governors of Saint-Domingue